Victoria most commonly refers to:

 Victoria (state), a state of the Commonwealth of Australia
 Victoria, British Columbia, provincial capital of British Columbia, Canada
 Victoria (mythology), Roman goddess of Victory
 Victoria, Seychelles, the capital city of the Seychelles
 Queen Victoria (1819–1901), Queen of the United Kingdom (1837–1901), Empress of India (1876–1901)

Victoria may also refer to:

People
 Victoria (name), including a list of people with the name
 Princess Victoria (disambiguation), several princesses named Victoria

 Victoria (Gallic Empire) (died 271), 3rd-century figure in the Gallic Empire
 Victoria, Lady Welby (1837–1912), English philosopher of language, musician and artist
 Victoria of Baden (1862–1930), queen-consort of Sweden as wife of King Gustaf V
 Victoria, Crown Princess of Sweden (born 1977)
 Victoria, ring name of wrestler Lisa Marie Varon (born 1971)
 Victoria (born 1987), professional name of Song Qian, Chinese singer-songwriter and actress
 Victoria Georgieva (born 1997), Bulgarian singer known by the mononym Victoria
 Victória (footballer) (born 1998), Victória Kristine Albuquerque de Miranda, Brazilian footballer

Places

Argentina 
 Victoria, Buenos Aires
 Victoria Department, in Entre Ríos Province
 Victoria, Entre Ríos

Australia 
 County of Victoria, South Australia
 Electoral district of Victoria, South Australia
 Province of Victoria, Anglican ecclesiastical province in Australia
 Victoria (Australia), a state of the Commonwealth of Australia
 Victoria Valley, Tasmania, a locality
 Victoria Settlement or New Victoria, alternate names for Port Essington in the Northern Territory

Canada 
 Victoria, British Columbia, provincial capital
 Greater Victoria, metropolitan around the provincial capital
 Victoria Harbour (British Columbia)
 Victoria, Manitoba
 Victoria, Newfoundland and Labrador
 Victoria River (Newfoundland and Labrador)
 Victoria, Nova Scotia
 Victoria Ward (Ottawa), Ontario
 Victoria, Prince Edward Island
 Victoria Island (Canada), Nunavut/Northwest Territories
 Victoria Trail, Edmonton

Canadian electoral districts 

 Canadian Senate divisions, named Victoria (in Quebec, Ontario, British Columbia, Nova Scotia, New Brunswick) and Victoria-Carleton (in New Brunswick)
 Victoria (Alberta electoral district) (1909–1925)
 Victoria (Alberta provincial electoral district) (1905–1940)
 Victoria (British Columbia electoral district) (1871–1890 and since 1966)
 Victoria (electoral district), a federal electoral district in British Columbia
 Victoria (New Brunswick electoral district) (1867–1914)
 Victoria (New Brunswick provincial electoral district) (1846–1973)
 Victoria (Nova Scotia electoral district) (1867–1904)
 Victoria (N.W.T. electoral district) (1894–1905)
 Victoria (Ontario electoral district) (1903–1966)
 Victoria City (electoral district) (1904–1924), a federal electoral district in British Columbia
 Victoria City (provincial electoral district), (1861–1963)

Hong Kong 
 Victoria Harbour, between Hong Kong Island and Kowloon
 Victoria, Hong Kong, the de facto capital of Hong Kong during the British colonial period
 Victoria Peak, a mountain in the western half of Hong Kong Island

Mexico 
 Ciudad Victoria, the capital of the Mexican state of Tamaulipas, Mexico
 Victoria, Guanajuato
 Victoria Municipality, Guanajuato
 Victoria Municipality, Tamaulipas

New Zealand 

 Victoria, Gisborne
 Victoria, Rotorua

Philippines 
 Victoria, Laguna
 Victoria, Northern Samar
 Victoria, Oriental Mindoro, a 2nd class municipality
 Victoria, Roxas, Oriental Mindoro, a barangay
 Victoria, Tarlac
 Victorias City, Negros Occidental
 Ciudad de Victoria, a tourism and entertainment complex in Bulacan

Romania 
 Victoria, Botoșani County, a village in Hlipiceni Commune
 Victoria, Botoșani County, a village in Stăuceni Commune
 Victoria, Brașov, a town in Brașov County
 Victoria, Brăila, a commune in Brăila County
 Victoria, Iași, a commune in Iași County
 Victoria, Tulcea County, a village in Nufăru Commune

United Kingdom 
 Victoria (Hackney ward), a civic ward in the London Borough of Hackney, England, UK
 Victoria (Sefton ward), a civic ward in the Metropolitan Borough of Sefton, Merseyside, England, UK
 Victoria, Cornwall, a hamlet
 Victoria, Newport, Wales
 Victoria, London, a district named after Queen Victoria
 Victoria, Roman name of Comrie, Scotland
 Victoria, ward of Newbury, Berkshire

United States 
 Victoria, Alabama
 Victoria, Arkansas
 Victoria, Georgia
 Victoria, Illinois
 Victoria, Indiana
 Victoria, Greene County, Indiana
 Victoria, Kansas
 Victoria, Louisiana
 Victoria, Michigan
 Victoria, Minnesota
 Victoria, Bolivar County, Mississippi, a ghost town
 Victoria, Marshall County, Mississippi
 Victoria, Missouri
 Victoria (Charlotte, North Carolina), a historic home in Mecklenburg County
 Victoria, Texas
 Victoria, Virginia
 Victoria, West Virginia

 Victoria, Aguadilla, Puerto Rico, a barrio

Other places in Africa 
 Limbe, Cameroon, known as "Victoria" until 1982
 Victoria (neighborhood), Alexandria, Egypt
 Victoria, Seychelles, capital of the country of Seychelles
 Victoria, Gauteng, South Africa
 Victoria Bay, a small cove in the Western Cape, South Africa
 Lake Victoria, with shoreline in Kenya, Uganda, and Tanzania
 Masvingo Province, previously Victoria Province, in Zimbabwe

Other places in the Americas 
 Victoria, Chile, a city in Malleco Province, southern Chile
 Victoria, Caldas, a town and municipality in the Department of Caldas, Colombia
 Victoria, Cabañas, a municipality in the department of Cabañas, El Salvador
 Victoria, Grenada, a town in Saint Mark Parish
 Victoria, Guyana
 Victoria, Yoro, Honduras

Elsewhere 
 12 Victoria, a main-belt IIIa asteroid
 Victoria (crater), in the Meridiani Planum, Mars, named after one of Ferdinand Magellan's ships
 Victoria Land, Antarctica
 Victória, former spelling of Vitória, Espírito Santo, Brazil
 The Latin name of the siege camp during the battle of Parma, Italy, intended by Frederick II to be the seat of his kingdom.
 Victoria, Labuan, the capital of the Federal Territory of Labuan, Malaysia
 Victoria, Gozo, capital of Gozo, Malta
 Victoria, Sărăteni, Leova district, Moldova

Beverages 
 Victoria (Cervecería Centro Americana), a pale Guatemalan lager
 Victoria (Grupo Modelo), a dark Mexican lager
 Victoria (soda), a fruit-flavored soda available in Querétaro (México) and owned by The Coca-Cola Company
 Victoria Bitter, a bitter Australian lager

Animals and plants
 Victoria (moth), a moth genus in the family Geometridae
 Victoria (plant), a waterlily genus in the family Nymphaeaceae
 Victoria plum, a plum cultivar
 Victoria (goose), the first goose to receive a prosthetic 3D printed beak
 Victoria (grape), another name for the German/Italian wine grape Trollinger

Transport

Maritime 
Galera Victoria, Spanish galleon which sank in 1729
 HMCS Victoria (SSK 876), a Canadian submarine
 HMS Victoria, four ships of the British Royal Navy
 HMVS Victoria, two ships of the Victorian Naval Force
 Lake Victoria ferries of Kenya, Tanzania and Uganda
 MV Princess Victoria, a ferry that sank on 31 January 1953
 Queen Victoria (ship), several ships
 , a Lake Victoria ferry now called MV Victoria
 Spanish frigate Victoria (F82), a Spanish frigate
 SS Victoria (1870), a coastal passenger liner operated by the Alaska Steamship Company
SS Victoria (Liberty), a Panamanian liberty ship in service 1947–50
 , a passenger vessel built for the London and South Western Railway
 , a passenger vessel built for the Pacific Steam Navigation Company
 , a Cross-Channel and Isle of Man ferry
 Victoria 17, an American sailboat design
 Victoria 18, an American sailboat design
 Victoria, a ferry that sank 24 May 1881 in London, Ontario (see List of Canadian disasters by death toll)
 Victoria (ship) (also known as Nao Victoria and Vittoria), the first ship to circumnavigate the world
 Victoria (sternwheeler), an 1869 paddle steamer from the upper Fraser River
 Victoria Class (disambiguation), various ship classes named Victoria

Rail 
 GWR Victoria Class, type of steam locomotive
 Victoria (Plynlimon & Hafan Tramway locomotive), a locomotive on the former Plynlimon & Hafan Tramway
 London Victoria station, the second busiest rail terminus in London
 Victoria station (disambiguation), several railway and bus stations
 Victoria line, a south-west to north-east line that runs through central London on the London Underground network

Other forms of transport 
 Victoria (carriage), open carriage named after Queen Victoria
 Victoria (Mexico City Metrobús), a BRT station in Mexico City
 Victoria (motorcycle), a now defunct German bicycle and motorcycle manufacturer
 Vickers Victoria, troop transport aircraft of the British Royal Air Force
 Crown Victoria, an American full-size car

Sports 
 C.D. Victoria, Honduran football team
 Northwich Victoria F.C., Cheshire, England
 Victorian Bushrangers, Australian cricket team
 Victoria CF, Spanish football team
 Victoria Jaworzno, a Polish boxing and football team
 Victoria Libertas Pesaro, an Italian basketball team
 Victoria National Golf Club, Indiana, U.S.
 Victoria Rosport, a Luxembourg football team
 Victoria Vikes, the athletic program of the University of Victoria in Canada
 Victoria SC, a Bangladesh football team

Arts and media

Films 
 Victoria (1917 film), a Russian silent film directed by Olga Preobrazhenskaya, based on the Knut Hamsun novel
 Victoria (1935 film), a 1935 German film
 Victoria (1972 film), a 1972 Mexican film based on Henry James' 1880 novel Washington Square
 Victoria (1979 film), a 1979 Swedish film based on the Knut Hamsun novel
 Victoria (2008 film), a 2008 French-Canadian film
 The Young Victoria, a 2009 film
 Victoria (2013 film), a 2013 Norwegian film
 Viktoria (film), a 2014 Bulgarian-Romanian film
 Victoria (2015 film), a 2015 German film
 In Bed with Victoria, a 2016 French adult drama film with the original title Victoria
 Victoria and Abdul, a 2017 film

Games 
 Victoria: An Empire Under the Sun, computer game by Paradox Interactive
 Victoria II, the sequel from Paradox Interactive
 Victoria 3, the third game from the Victoria series from Paradox Interactive

Literature 
 Victoria: a novel of 4th generation war, a 2014 novel by William S. Lind
 Victoria (Michael novel), a 1993 novel by Sami Michael
 Victoria (novel), an 1898 novel by Knut Hamsun

Music 
 "Victoria" (Dance Exponents song), 1982
 "Victoria" (Eve 6 song), 2012
 "Victoria" (The Kinks song), 1969 (covered by The Fall in 1988)
 "Victoria" (Magnus Uggla song), 1993
 "Victoria", a 2008 song by Jukebox the Ghost song from Let Live and Let Ghosts

Television 
 Victoria (Mexican TV series), a 1987 Mexican telenovela
 Victoria (2007 TV series), a 2007 American telenovela
 Victoria (British TV series), a 2016 British television series

Characters 
 Victoria (Twilight), an antagonist from the Twilight series by Stephenie Meyer
 Victoria Hand, a character from Marvel Comics
 Victoria Lord, the principal character in the long-running soap opera One Life to Live
 Victoria the White Cat from Andrew Lloyd Webber's musical Cats
 Victoria Waterfield, a character from Doctor Who
 Victoria Winters, the young governess in Dark Shadows

Other media 
 Victoria (3D figure), the articulated 3D figure by DAZ 3D
 Victoria (birthing simulator), a medical-education simulator by Gaumard Scientific

Other uses 
 Victoria Jubilee Government High School, a school which is situated in Bangladesh

See also 

 List of places named after Queen Victoria
 
 
 Victorias (disambiguation)
 The Victoria (disambiguation)
 La Victoria (disambiguation)
 Lake Victoria (disambiguation)
 Mount Victoria (disambiguation)
 Port of Victoria (disambiguation)
 Princess Victoria (disambiguation)
 Queen Victoria (disambiguation), other queens named Victoria
 Victoria Avenue (disambiguation)
 Victoria Building (disambiguation)
 Victoria Bridge (disambiguation)
 Victoria College (disambiguation)
 Victoria County (disambiguation)
 Victoria Dam (disambiguation)
 Victoria Dock (disambiguation)
 Victoria Hill (disambiguation)
 Victoria Hospital (disambiguation)
 Victoria Island (disambiguation)
 Victoria Memorial (disambiguation)
 Victoria Park (disambiguation)
 Victoria Peak (disambiguation)
 Victoria Regina (disambiguation)
 Victoria Road (disambiguation)
 Victoria Square (disambiguation)
 Victoria Street (disambiguation)
 Victoria Theatre (disambiguation)
 Victoria Tower (disambiguation)
 Victoria Township (disambiguation)
 Victoria University (disambiguation)
 Victoria Ward (disambiguation)
 Victorian (disambiguation)
 Viktoria (disambiguation)
 Vitoria (disambiguation)
 Victor (disambiguation)
 Victorio (disambiguation)